The 1963–64 Eintracht Frankfurt season was the 64th season in the club's football history. In 1963–64 the club played in the Bundesliga, the newly found top tier of German football. It was the club's 1st season in the Bundesliga.

The season ended up with Eintracht reaching the German cup final for the first time, losing to TSV 1860 München.

Matches

Legend

Friendlies

Bundesliga

Results summary

Results by round

League fixtures and results

League table

DFB-Pokal

Final

Squad

Squad and statistics

|}

Transfers

Transferred in

Transferred out

References

Sources

External links
 Official English Eintracht website 
 German archive site
 1963–64 Bundesliga season at Fussballdaten.de 

1963-64
German football clubs 1963–64 season